Sir Park Goff, 1st Baronet, KC (12 February 1871 – 14 April 1939) was a barrister and Conservative Party politician in England.

Goff was knighted on 26 June 1918, and at the 1918 general election he was elected as member of parliament (MP) for Cleveland. He had stood as a Coalition Conservative, and like others holding the "coalition coupon", he defeated the sitting Liberal Party MP Herbert Samuel.

Goff was re-elected in 1922, but the constituency remained a 3-way marginal seat, with Liberal, Conservative and Labour Party candidates all polling over 27% of the votes throughout the 1920s, and he lost in 1923 to the Liberal candidate Sir Charles Walter Starmer.  Goff regained the seat at the 1924 general election, but was defeated again at the 1929 election, this time by the Labour candidate William Thomas Mansfield.

Goff did not stand again in Cleveland, but at the 1931 election he was elected as MP for Chatham in Kent. He stood down from Parliament at the 1935 general election.

He was appointed as a King's Counsel in 1925, and made a baronet on 3 March 1936, 'of Goffs Oak, in the County of Hertford'. The title became extinct on his death in 1939, aged 68.

References

External links 
 

1871 births
1939 deaths
Conservative Party (UK) MPs for English constituencies
UK MPs 1918–1922
UK MPs 1922–1923
UK MPs 1924–1929
UK MPs 1931–1935
Knights Bachelor
Baronets in the Baronetage of the United Kingdom
20th-century King's Counsel
English King's Counsel
People from Goffs Oak